Marian Zidaru  (born 22 August 1956, Balotești, Ilfov, Romania) is a Romanian artist.

Studies
 1991–1995 Assistant to Sculpture Department of Bucharest National University of Arts
 1977–1981 Fine Arts Institute "Nicolae Grigorescu – taught by Vladimir Predescu and Marin Iliescu
 1977 Fine Arts High School, Craiova

Bibliography
 Marian Zidaru "Desene 1984 -2014", Editura Vellant, 2014, texte de Erwin Kessler, Cristian Bădiliță și Dan Popescu
 Monografia "Zidaru – dans werk von Marian & Victoria Zidaru", coordinatori: Doina Talmann și Günter Strunck, Editura Klartext Verlang, Essen, Germania, 2011, texte de Ruth Fabritius, Christoph Kiwelitz, Magda Cârneci şi Erwin Kessler.                                             
 Catalogul Expoziției Zidaru – Ingeri, Tronuri, Voievozi, Centrul Cultural Palatele Brâncovenești Mogoșoaia, text si curator Erwin Kessler
 Marian Zidaru Catalogul expoziției "Rememorare” sau "Crăciun însângerat”, editat de Editura Uniunii Artiștilor din România, curator si text Anca Vasiliu, Muzeul Satului și de Artă Populară al R. S. R.,[ Muzeul Național al Satului "Dimitrie Gusti”, București], 1985                                                                                                                                                                   *Babeti, Coriolan -"Bisanzio dopo Bisanzio", Mostra D’arte Romena Contemporanea, Istituto Romeno di Cultura e Ricerca Umanistica, Palazzo Correr – Venezia, 1993
 La Biennnale Di Venezia. 46. Esposizione Internazionale d'Arte, English Edition Coll Cataloghi Marsilio Editori, 1995, [ Rumania – Comisar: Dan Haulica, Assistant Commissioner: Coriolan Babeti];
 Magda Cârneci, Le sculpteur: Marian Zidaru, Disciple de Brancusi ou artiste Prophete?, Ligeia, nr.57-58-59-60, ianuarie-iunie, Paris, 2005
 The Zidarus, Wards by Laura Yates, Randon Art Magazine, London, 2009                                                                            
 Magda Cârneci, “Cazul Zidaru”, Revista 22, nr.47, 1998                                                                                               
 Theodor Redlow, "Aportes des temps derniers”, interviu cu Marian Zidaru, în Revista "Arta”, nr.4, București,1992;
 Calin Dan, Aspecte ale unei generatii [Expozitia Tohatan-Stanescu-Zidaru], p. 30, Arta nr.11, anul 1986
 Erwin Kessler, X:20 – O radiografie a artei romanesti dupa 1989, Editura Vellant, 2013                                            
 Adrian Buga, Albumul Colecția Regală de Artă Contemporană, Marian Zidaru prezent la litera Z cu lucrarea "Valiza Regelui Mihai", Editura Unarte, București, 2011
 Adrian Guță, Generația 80 în artele vizuale, Editura Paralela 45, 2008  
 Constantin Prut, Dicționarul de Artă Modernă și Contemporană, Editura Univers Enciclopedic, 2002
 Vlasiu, Ioana (coord.), Dicționarul sculptorilor din România. Secolele XIX-XX. vol. II, lit. H-Z, Editura Academiei Române, București, 2011, p. 365
 Mariana Celac (Ed.) Bolt: Romanian Pavilion at the 11th International Architecture Exhibition, La Biennale di Venezia 2008: Out There. Architecture Beyond Building/ Catalogue edited by Mariana Celac; Texts by: Gabriela Adamesteanu, Paul Balaci, Geta Bratescu, Serban Cantacuzino, Ion Grigorescu, Ioana Iordache, Christian Mandeal, Marius Marcu-Lapadat, Solomon Marcus, Vintila MIhailescu, Cosmin Manolache, Serban Sturdza, Vlad Sturdza, Calin Torsan, Marian Zidaru, Editura Simetria, 2008
 Alexandra Titu (coordonator) – Experiment  în Artă Românească după 1960, Editat de Centrul Soros pentru Artă Contemporană, 1997, Redactor sef: Magda Carneci, Editor: Irina Cios  
 Constantin Prut, Marian Zidaru, Albumul, L'art Roumain, Répères Contemporains, p. 48, Editura U. A. P. din România, 1995
 Erwin Kessler, CeArta,  Editura Nemira, 1997, București

References

External links
 Official Website

1956 births
Living people
20th-century Romanian artists
21st-century Romanian artists
People from Ilfov County
Romanian sculptors
Romanian painters